So What's New? is an album by Horst Jankowski, released in 1966 (see 1966 in music). All tracks are instrumentals. The album features the humorous piano ballad "So What's New?", which, due to its arrangements of the wind section, can be regarded a Christmas song. There are two other songs on the album which are famous melodies that sometimes appear in popular culture, namely "My Roman Love Song" and "Highway At Night".

Track listing

"So What's New?" – 1:54
"Moonlight Cocktail" – 3:08
"A Place In The Sun" – 2:59
"Exactly You" – 2:55
"Grand Amour" – 2:49
"Bossa Novissima" – 2:58
"Dreamers Concerto" – 2:40
"Strangers In The Night" – 3:17
"All My Happiness" – 2:33
"My Roman Love Song" - 2:08
"Paris Parade" - 2:06
"Highway At Night" - 3:04

Production
Arrangers: Horst Jankowski, Bernd Rabe

Charts
Album - Billboard (North America)

Horst Jankowski albums
1966 albums
Mercury Records albums

de:Christopher Cross (Album)
sv:Christopher Cross (album)